Trainspotting is the first novel by Scottish writer Irvine Welsh, first published in 1993.  It takes the form of a collection of short stories, written in either Scots, Scottish English or British English, revolving around various residents of Leith, Edinburgh who either use heroin, are friends of the core group of heroin users, or engage in destructive activities that are effectively addictions. The novel is set in the late 1980s and has been described by The Sunday Times as "the voice of punk, grown up, grown wiser and grown eloquent".

The novel has since achieved a cult status and served as the basis for the film Trainspotting (1996), directed by Danny Boyle. A sequel called Porno was published in 2002. A prequel called Skagboys was published in April 2012.

Characters 
 Mark "Rent Boy" Renton – The novel's protagonist and most frequent narrator, Renton is the voice of reason among his group of friends, many of whom he dislikes. He narrates his daily life – from supporting his heroin addiction with dole money and petty theft to interacting with the "normal world" – with a cynical approach. He is intelligent and capable of participating in mainstream society, but he is misanthropic and depressed, and uses heroin to give purpose to his life as well as for hedonistic purposes. 
 Simon "Sick Boy" Williamson – A promiscuous, amoral con artist and one of Renton's close friends. He is often on the lookout for potential scams and has little respect for the many women he seduces. Sick Boy swears off heroin after the death of the infant Dawn, implied to be his daughter, who asphyxiates while her mother Lesley and Sick Boy are on a heroin binge. 
 Daniel "Spud" Murphy – Naive and childlike, Spud is both the whipping boy and only real source of comfort among Renton's circle of friends, who feel protective of him even as they take advantage of him. Spud is kind, sensitive, and loves animals. Spud is sent to Saughton Prison for a section of the novel for petty theft.
 Francis "Franco" Begbie – A violent psychopath and alcoholic, Begbie bullies his "friends" to go along with whatever he says, assaulting or intimidating anyone who challenges him. He expresses intense loyalty to his friends even though he considers junkies beneath him.
 Davie Mitchell – Another Leith native and acquaintance of Renton. Davie is a university graduate and holds down a decent job. His life is thrown into chaos when he contracts HIV. He narrates the chapters "Bad Blood" and "Traditional Sunday Breakfast".
 Tommy Lawrence – A childhood friend of Renton's, Tommy asks Renton for heroin to try after his girlfriend dumps him, which Renton reluctantly provides. Tommy's resulting addiction, illness and death weighs heavily on Renton's conscience.
 Rab "Second Prize" McLaughlin – A friend of the main group, who is often inebriated and gets into frequent fights while drunk, which he always loses. Second Prize had a promising career as a pro footballer for Manchester United, but he was fired from the team after a few years because of his drinking problem.

Structure
The novel is split into seven sections. The first six sections contain multiple chapters from various perspectives; the final section contains one chapter. The novel's plot is nonlinear. 

Most chapters are narrated in first-person, stream-of-consciousness style in some combination of Scots and Standard English. Some chapters are written from a third-person omniscient stance to convey the actions and thoughts of several characters in a scene.

Plot summary

Section 1: Kicking 
Mark and Simon (a.k.a. Sick Boy) are watching a Jean-Claude Van Damme video when they decide to go buy heroin from Johnny Swan (also called "Mother Superior") since they are both feeling symptoms of withdrawal. They cook up with Raymie and Alison. After being informed that he should go and see Kelly, who has just had an abortion, Renton goes home to finish his video instead.

Mark initially tries to come off heroin by acquiring a bare room and all the things he will require when coming down (canned soup, headache medicine, and pails for vomit). When withdrawal begins to set in, however, he resolves to get another hit to ease the decline. Unable to find any heroin, he acquires opium suppositories which, after a heavy bout of diarrhoea, he must recover from a bookie's lavatory. Simon attempts to pick up girls while being annoyed by Mark, who wants to watch videos. Sick Boy loses Renton and launches into an internal monologue that is self-glorifying and nihilistic.

The chapter "It Goes Without Saying" opens with the death of an infant, Dawn, whose mother Lesley is a heroin addict and acquaintance of the main characters. The cause of death is unclear; characters speculate that it may have been a cot death or caused by neglect. The Skag Boys are unsure of how to respond. Sick Boy becomes notably more emotional and distressed than the others and eventually breaks down as well, stating he is kicking heroin for good. Simon does not explicitly state that he was the child's father, playing to the title of the story. Mark wants to comfort his friend, but is unsure how and cooks a shot for himself in order to deal with the situation. A sobbing Lesley asks him to also cook her up a hit, which Mark does but makes sure he injects himself before her, stating the action "goes without saying".

Section 2: Relapsing 
After an argument with his girlfriend Carol, Second Prize meets Tommy in a pub, and Tommy confronts a man who is punching his girlfriend. They are shocked to find the woman supports her abusive boyfriend instead of her would-be liberators by digging her nails into Tommy's face, inciting a brawl. While the couple slips out unnoticed, Tommy and Second Prize find themselves taking the blame for the whole affair from the pub locals.

Renton, Begbie and their girlfriends meet up for a drink before going to a party, but it ends when Begbie throws a glass off a balcony, hitting someone and splitting open their head, setting off a huge pub brawl.

In another scene, Tommy comes around to Renton's flat (shortly after Renton relapsed) after being dumped by his girlfriend. Renton reluctantly gives him some heroin, setting off Tommy's gradual decline into addiction, HIV/AIDS, and later, death.

Later, Renton's brother Billy and his friends Lenny, Naz Peasbo, and Jackie are waiting for their friend Granty to arrive for a game of cards, as he is holding the money pot. They later find out that Granty is dead and his girlfriend has disappeared with the money, prompting them to beat Jackie, whom they knew to have been sleeping with her.

Section 3: Kicking Again 
Begbie and Lexo have pulled an unknown crime, so Begbie decides to lie low in London with Renton. The chapter called 'Inter Shitty' covers their train journey.

Spud manages to kick heroin, and visits his grandmother, where his mixed-race uncle Dode is staying. He recounts the trouble that Dode has had with racism growing up, particularly an event when he and Spud went to a pub and were assaulted by white power skinheads. This abuse led to a fight, which left Dode hospitalised, where Spud visits him.

Renton has kicked heroin and is restless. He picks up a girl at a nightclub, Dianne, unaware that she is only fourteen. He is later forced to lie to her parents at breakfast the following morning. Despite his guilt and discomfort, he sleeps with Dianne again when she shows up at his flat. Spud, Renton and Sick Boy take some ecstasy and stroll to the Meadows where an excited Sick Boy and Renton try to kill a squirrel but stop after Spud becomes upset by their actions towards the animal. He states to the reader that you can't love yourself if you hurt animals as it's wrong and compares their innocence to that of Simon's dead baby Dawn. He also states that squirrels are "lovely" and "free" and that "that's maybe what Rents can't stand" indicating Mark envies those he feels are completely unbound and free. Mark is ashamed and Spud forgives him quickly and the pair embrace, before Simon breaks them up.

Section 4: Blowing It 
Renton and Spud are in court for stealing books. Renton gets a suspended sentence owing to his attempts at rehabilitation, while Spud is sentenced to ten months in prison. Renton relapses and has to suffer heroin withdrawal at his parents' house, where he experiences hallucinations of the dead baby Dawn, the television programme he is watching, and the lecture provided by his father. He is later visited by Sick Boy and goes out to a pub with his parents, whose unnerving enthusiasm acts as a veneer for their authoritative treatment.  

Renton's brother Billy dies in Northern Ireland with the British Army. Renton attends the funeral; there, he almost starts a fight with some of his father's Unionist relatives, and ends up having sex with Billy's pregnant girlfriend in the toilet. Renton discusses the hypocrisy of Unionism and the British in Northern Ireland.

Section 5: Exile
Renton is stranded in London with no place to sleep. He tries to fall asleep in an all-night porno theatre, where he meets an old homosexual named Gi, who lets him stay at his flat. Later, Renton, Spud, Begbie, Gav, Alison and others venture out for another drink and something to eat. Spud and the others reflect upon their sex lives.

Section 6: Home
Spud, Begbie, and a teenager have engaged in a criminal robbery. Spud recounts the crime and comments on Begbie's paranoia and how the teenager is likely to get ripped off by the pair. Gav tells Renton the story of how Matty died of toxoplasmosis after attempting to rekindle his relationship with his ex using a kitten.

The group attends Matty's funeral, where they reflect on his downfall, and what may have caused it. Later, Renton returns to Leith for Christmas and meets Begbie, who beats up an innocent man after having seen his alcoholic father in the disused Leith Central railway station. He visits a former drug dealer, Johnny Swan, who has had his leg amputated as a result of heroin use, and he visits Tommy, who is dying of AIDS.

Section 7: Exit
Renton, Sick Boy, Begbie, Spud and Second Prize go to London to engage in a low-key heroin deal and see a Pogues gig. The book ends with Renton stealing the cash and going to Amsterdam. Renton thinks to himself that he will send Spud his cut, as he is the only 'innocent' party.

Stage adaptation
Soon after publication, the book was adapted for the stage by Harry Gibson. The stage version inspired the subsequent film, and regularly toured the UK in the mid-1990s. This adaptation starred Ewen Bremner and later Tam Dean Burn as Renton.

The US stage premier occurred in San Francisco, California in 1996. It was produced and shown in the upstairs room (a tiny 50-seat theatre) at the Edinburgh Castle Pub, the small but legendary literary and arts bar.  The play was produced and directed by Alan Black, the head of the Scottish Cultural and Arts Foundation, which was an organization that held Scottish-connected events in San Francisco in the 90s. The play was a huge success. It was twice extended and hundreds of hopeful viewers had to be turned away because of a lack of space in the tiny theater above the pub. 

The Los Angeles production of Trainspotting won the 2002 Los Angeles Drama Critics Circle Award for Direction, and the 2002 LA Weekly Theater Award for Direction, for director Roger Mathey.

In 2013 In Your Face Theatre and Seabright Productions staged a new immersive production of Gibson's adaptation rebranded as Trainspotting Live. Directed by Adam Spreadbury-Maher and Greg Esplin, this production has gone on to sell out at three Edinburgh Festival Fringes and played to critical acclaim in London, on several UK tours and in New York City.

Film adaptation

The film was directed by Danny Boyle, with an adapted screenplay written by John Hodge. It starred Ewan McGregor, Robert Carlyle, Jonny Lee Miller and Ewen Bremner. Welsh made a cameo appearance as the drug dealer Mikey Forrester. The film was ranked 10th by the British Film Institute (BFI) in its list of Top 100 British films of all time. It also brought Welsh's book to an international cinema audience and added to the phenomenal popularity of the novel.

Reception 
Trainspotting was longlisted for the 1993 Booker Prize (and was apparently rejected for the shortlist after "offending the sensibilities of two judges").

Welsh claimed that the book had sold over one million copies in the UK by 2015, and been translated into thirty languages.

References

Further reading

External links

 Irvine Welsh discusses Trainspotting on the BBC World Book Club

1993 British novels
1993 debut novels
1993 in Scotland
Black comedy books
Books about depression
British novels adapted into films
Nonlinear narrative novels
Novels by Irvine Welsh
Novels set in Edinburgh
Novels about heroin addiction
Scottish English
Scots-language works
Trainspotting
Secker & Warburg books
Leith

fr:Trainspotting